Why You Should Give a Damn About Gay Marriage is a 2004 book by Davina Kotulski in which the author advocates the legal recognition of same-sex marriage. It received generally positive reviews in the LGBT press.

Summary
Kotulski states that heterosexual couples who marry in the United States gain at least 1,049 federal rights, all of which are denied to same-sex couples who cannot legally marry. She rejects alternatives to marriage such as domestic partnership and civil union, describing these as inferior options for gay people.

Background and publication history

Davina Kotulski is a clinical psychologist and LGBT rights activist. Why You Should Give a Damn About Gay Marriage was her first book; according to Kotulski, she wrote it in four and a half months. The book was first published in April 2004 by Advocate Books, an imprint of Alyson Publications.

Kotulski and McKay received the "Defenders of Love" Award from the East Bay Pride Committee, and in 2004, she received the "Saints Alive" award from the San Francisco Metropolitan Community Church and was "sainted" by the Sisters of Perpetual Indulgence for her activism and advocacy for same-sex marriage. In 2006, Kotulski and McKay received the Michael "Switzer Leadership Award" from New Leaf Counseling Center in San Francisco.

Reception
Why You Should Give a Damn About Gay Marriage received positive reviews from Brad Benedict in Ambush Magazine, Joe E. Jeffreys in the Bay Area Reporter, the novelist Lori L. Lake in Sinister Wisdom, and Steffen Silvis in Willamette Week. It received a mixed review from Andrew Hicks in The Gayly Oklahoman.

Benedict described Why You Should Give a Damn About Gay Marriage as "a quick-witted, common sense handbook" and "a vital resource" for journalists covering the same-sex marriage debate. Jeffreys wrote that Kotulski had used "easy-to-understand, lively, conversational prose" to explain complicated legal matters. He credited her with advancing a "solid and speedy" argument for supporting same-sex marriage. Lake called the book "a quick and simple read". She predicted that readers would "begin to see new possibilities in their lives, and be inspired to join the growing freedom to marry movement".

Silvis wrote that, as a queer person, he had previously "looked disdainfully upon gay marriage as a plot to domesticate our uniqueness"; however, Kotulski's book had convinced him otherwise. He credited her with arguing rigorously for "a wider definition of marriage" and convincingly addressing objections. Hicks found the beginning chapters "vivid and exciting", but believed that the later ones lacked entertainment value and contained too many illustrations and diagrams.

References

Bibliography

External links
  Radio Netherlands' Love Exile on the Road, a radio program about the Marriage Equality Express and the story of Americans who had to leave the United States to be with their same-sex foreign partners 
 "Battle Over Same-Sex Marriage: Tales from the road of gay rights caravan Marriage advocates share their stories as they head to D.C."   October 6, 2004 
 "A Grim Anniversary"  October 7, 2004  
 "Tension Grips Caravan" October 8, 2004 
  "Freedom Riders Loaded with Tech" October 9, 2004  
 "Marriage rights caravan gets lots of 'no thanks' from gays along road."    October 10, 2004 
 "Canvassing the nation for gay marriage rights: Activists visit hometowns en route to D.C. rally today"   October 11, 2004 
  "Marriage equality caravan joins spirited rally in D.C.: Tired but happy, couples renew vows"  October 12, 2004 

2004 non-fiction books
2000s LGBT literature
American non-fiction books
Books about same-sex marriage
Books by Davina Kotulski
English-language books
LGBT literature in the United States